Michael Kirchmann (14 August 1914 – 15 November 1942) was a German skier. He competed in the military patrol at the 1936 Summer Olympics. He was killed in action during the Siege of Leningrad.

References

1914 births
1942 deaths
People from Oberallgäu
Sportspeople from Swabia (Bavaria)
German military patrol (sport) runners
Military patrol competitors at the 1936 Winter Olympics
German military personnel killed in World War II
Winter Olympics competitors for Germany